Master (also Romanized as Māster and Māstar; also known as Moassar) is a village in Talkh Ab Rural District, Khenejin District, Farahan County, Markazi Province, Iran. At the 2006 census, its population was 675, in 212 families.

References 

Populated places in Farahan County